St John Freight Systems Ltd is an Indian Logistic Company Headquartered in Tuticorin and the largest Private Logistic Operator in South India. It is considered the largest container shipping company in South India by revenue and employs approximately 1,400 people. .
It has Offices in 18 Countries.

References

External links 

1979 establishments in Tamil Nadu
Companies based in Tamil Nadu
Companies based in Tuticorin
Indian companies established in 1979
Transport companies established in 1979